Look Who's Back is a 2015 German satirical black comedy film directed by David Wnendt and based on the 2012 novel of the same name by Timur Vermes. The film features unscripted vignettes of Oliver Masucci as Adolf Hitler interacting with ordinary Germans, interspersed with scripted storyline sequences. It was listed as one of eight films that could be the German submission for the Best Foreign Language Film at the 89th Academy Awards, but it was not selected.

Plot

The film begins in Berlin, 2014. Adolf Hitler wakes up in the park where his Führerbunker once stood. As he wanders, disoriented, through the city, he interprets modern situations and things from a wartime perspective. Everyone he meets assumes he is an actor impersonating Hitler. Attempting to ask directions to the Reich Chancellery, Hitler is told by a mime to find his own spot and pepper-sprayed by a terrified young mother. Arriving at a newspaper kiosk and reading that it is 2014, he becomes dizzy and faints.

Meanwhile, moviemaker Fabian Sawatzki is fired from the television station MyTV and despondently watches the documentary he had been filming in the park where Hitler awoke. Seeing Hitler in the background, Sawatzki begins searching for him in hopes of getting his job back.

Waking at the kiosk, Hitler begins to read about modern Germany. Through the newspapers he discovers a completely different nation from the one he left and not one agreeable to him. Lamenting that Poland still exists on formerly German soil, Hitler says the whole war was a waste. He decides that destiny has resurrected him for a reason and vows to continue his work.

After finding the kiosk, Sawatzki proposes to travel across Germany with Hitler and film him for YouTube. Hitler agrees, and the two leave together. Travelling from the North Sea Coast to Bavaria, Sawatzki films Hitler interacting with ordinary Germans and promising to solve their problems with immigrants and guest-workers. When a Bavarian tells Hitler that he will never follow him, Hitler demands his name and address, saying that it is for "the first wave of arrests". The Bavarian responds that he is not worried.

Sawatzki's idea for an animal-centred film clip ends when Hitler shoots a dog with a concealed pistol. Sawatzki is outraged, but Hitler calls him a weakling and vows to make a man out of him. While their videos gain over a million hits, Sawatzki and Hitler return to Berlin. Sawatzki introduces both Hitler and his program idea to the MyTV station chiefs. The new MyTV chairman, Katja Bellini, decides to use Hitler in one of MyTV's comedies.

Before the show, Hitler learns about the Internet and uses it to prepare his return to politics. On air, Hitler presents his old plans for an ethnically homogeneous fascist state, and unintentionally becomes a big comedy hit. As his success in comedy increases, Christoph Sensenbrink, one of MyTV's executives, discovers the unedited footage of Hitler shooting the dog. Sensenbrink broadcasts the footage, ruining the burgeoning careers of Hitler, Sawatzki, and Bellini, and resulting in his own promotion to station chief.

With the help of Bellini and Sawatzki, Hitler publishes an autobiographical book about his new life in the 21st century, Er Ist Wieder Da ("Look Who's Back"), and it becomes a bestseller. Soon after, Sawatzki turns the book into a film. Without Hitler, MyTV's ratings and ad revenue drop precipitously and Sensenbrink, after a fit of rage (parodying Hitler's breakdown scene in the German drama film Downfall), decides he must rehire Hitler.

Hitler plays himself in the movie. After a night of filming, he is beaten by two Neo-Nazis who believe him to be a fraudulent impersonator mocking their beliefs. Hitler is hospitalized, but the news of his beating generates sympathy and he returns to high standing with the German people. While Hitler is recuperating, Sawatzki reviews his old footage and discovers a ball of energy (based on The Terminator) in the background before Hitler first appeared. Returning to the site, he finds burnt leaves. With horror, he realizes that the Hitler he encountered was the real person all along. He rushes to the hospital to confront Hitler, but finds only Katja, who says Hitler is at the movie studio. Katja does not understand Sawatzki when he says Hitler is real and he trashes the hospital room before running for the exit pursued by two hospital orderlies.

Sawatzki arrives at the movie studio, where he forces Hitler to the roof at gunpoint with his own pistol. Calmly, Hitler replies that he was elected by the German people, and if he is a monster, then so is everyone who voted for him. Enraged, Sawatzki shoots Hitler in the face and watches him fall off the roof to his apparent death. Suddenly Hitler reappears behind Sawatzki, claiming he cannot be killed, as he is a part of every German. This entire scene is revealed to be a part of the film, and Sawatzki is a body double wearing a silicone mask. The real Sawatzki has been committed to a mental hospital following his previous outburst that Hitler still lives.

Once the work for his film finishes, Hitler senses that he is on the path to a political comeback. He is more popular than ever, and nationalist Germans give him hope that Germany may be ready for his return to power. With Hitler and Bellini riding in the back seat of a car, and among images of actual nationalist demonstrations, the film ends with Hitler's voice-over: "I can work with this".

Cast 

As themselves in cameos (German TV and internet personalities): Klaas Heufer-Umlauf, Joko Winterscheidt, Frank Plasberg, Daniel Aminati, Jörg Thadeusz, Roberto Blanco, Micaela Schäfer, Dagi Bee, Freshtorge, Robert Hofmann, Joyce Ilg, Andrea Nahles, Nina Proll

Box office
The film was a box office success, reaching number one in Germany in its third week of release.

Remake
The film was remade in Italy as Sono tornato (I'm Back). The plot closely follows the German film except that it is Benito Mussolini rather than Hitler who magically reappears in the 21st century.

See also
 The 1980 Spanish satirical film And in the Third Year, He Rose Again explores the resurrection of dictator Francisco Franco in 1978 during the Spanish transition to democracy.

References

External links

 "The Netflix Movie Look Who’s Back Is Like Ali G but With Hitler, and It’s Mesmerizing.", Rebecca Schuman, Slate Magazine, N.p., 13 May 2016. Web. 04 Nov. 2016.
 
 

2015 comedy films
2010s comedy road movies
2010s political comedy films
2010s satirical films
Films about Adolf Hitler
Films about time travel
Films based on German novels
Films based on science fiction novels
Films set in 2014
Films set in Berlin
Films shot in Berlin
German comedy road movies
2010s German-language films
German political satire films
Films directed by David Wnendt
2010s German films
Films set in bunkers